Lukáš Rosol was the defending champion, but was eliminated by Stéphane Robert in the second round.
Stéphane Robert won the title, defeating Ádám Kellner 6–1, 6–3 in the final.

Seeds

Draw

Finals

Top half

Bottom half

References
 Main Draw
 Qualifying Draw

Prosperita Open - Singles
2011 Singles